Fustiaria is a genus of scaphopods in the order Dentaliida and is the only genus comprising the family Fustiariidae, with 24 species.

Description
The shells of Fustiaria are characterized as smooth, slender, circular in cross section, slightly curved, thin-walled, and virtually transparent.  The central tooth of its radula (chewing organ), called a "rachis", is unusual compared with that of other Dentaliids in that it is flat on its tip rather than pointed.  The space around the foot (the "pedal sinus") is divided by a thin horizontal membrane called a septum.

Species
Fustiaria caesura (Colman, 1958)
Fustiaria crosnieri Nicklès, 1979
Fustiaria diaphana V. Scarabino & F. Scarabino, 2010
Fustiaria electra V. Scarabino & F. Scarabino, 2010
Fustiaria engischista (Barnard, 1963)
Fustiaria gruveli (Dautzenberg, 1910)
Fustiaria langfordi (Habe, 1963)
Fustiaria liodon (Pilsbry & Sharp, 1897)
 † Fustiaria maoria P. A. Maxwell, 1992 
Fustiaria mariae Scarabino, 2008
Fustiaria nipponica (Yokoyama, 1922)
Fustiaria polita (Linnaeus, 1767)
Fustiaria rubescens (Deshayes, 1826)
Fustiaria steineri V. Scarabino, 2008
Fustiaria stenoschiza (Pilsbry & Sharp, 1897)
Fustiaria tenuifissum (Pilsbry & Sharp, 1897) (taxon inquirendum)
Fustiaria vagina Scarabino, 1995
Species brought into synonymy
 Fustiaria aequatoria (Pilsbry & Sharp, 1897) : synonym of Rhabdus aequatorius (Pilsbry & Sharp, 1897)
 Fustiaria brevicornu (Pilsbry & Sharp, 1897) : synonym of Compressidens brevicornu (Sharp & Pilsbry, 1897)
 Fustiaria dalli (Pilsbry & Sharp, 1897) : synonym of Rhabdus dalli (Pilsbry & Sharp, 1897): synonym of Rhabdus rectius (Carpenter, 1864)
 Fustiaria innumerabilis (Pilsbry & Sharp, 1897) : synonym of Episiphon innumerabile (Pilsbry & Sharp, 1897)
 Fustiaria splendida (G.B. Sowerby I, 1832) : synonym of Graptacme splendida (G. B. Sowerby I, 1832)

References

External links

 Monterosato T. A. (di) (1884). Nomenclatura generica e specifica di alcune conchiglie mediterranee. Palermo, Virzi, 152 pp.

Scaphopods